The Communist Academy (Russian: Коммунистическая академия, transliterated Kommunisticheskaya akademiya) was a higher educational establishment and research institute based in Moscow. It included scientific institutes of philosophy, history, literature, art and language, Soviet construction and law, world economy and world politics, economics, agrarian research as well as institutes of natural and social science. It was intended to allow Marxists to research problems independent of, and implicitly in rivalry with, the Academy of Sciences which long pre-existed the October Revolution and the subsequent formation of the Soviet Union.

The Socialist Academy

The Communist Academy was preceded by  the Socialist Academy of Social Sciences when it was founded on June 25, 1918 by decree of the All-Russian Central Executive Committee. The chairman of the academy was Mikhail Pokrovsky. On 15 April 1919, the name of the Academy was shortened to the Socialist Academy.

The Communist Academy
From April 17, 1924, the  Socialist Academy was finally transformed into the Communist Academy. On November 26, 1926, the Central Executive Committee of the USSR (ЦИК СССР) confirmed the charter of the CA. The Academy acquired some success and influence in the 1920s, especially in the social sciences and law under the direction of Evgeny Pashukanis. The Academy included approximately 100 active members and a number of corresponding members. The goals of the CA were research in social sciences, history, theory and practice of socialism. In December 1929, a Leningrad branch was opened.

The Communist Academy included the following institutes: philosophy, history, literature, art and language, contemporary development and law, world economy and world politics, economics, agrarian studies, natural sciences, and a series of special commissions on specific topics. After reorganization in 1932, the Communist Academy's main focus shifted to socialist development and world economy.

However, the very independence that originally inspired the new Academy caused it to run afoul of Joseph Stalin, and he abolished it in 1936, an early manifestation of his rapidly developing purges. According to a decree published on February 8, 1936, the Communist Academy was subsumed within the Soviet Academy of Sciences.

Journal: Bulletin of the Communist Academy
From 1924 the academy published the Вестник Коммунистической академии (Bulletin of the Communist Academy). For many years, the Communist Academy was a leading centre in the social sciences and played a leading role in the promulgation of Marxist–Leninist ideology. Initially the issues were numbered in continuity with the six previous issues of the Вестник Социалистической академии (Bulletin of the Socialist Academy).

Fundamental Library of the Social Sciences
The Academy's library was preserved as the Fundamental Library of the Social Sciences, which itself became an important part of the still-extant library of the Institute of Scientific Information of the Social Sciences.

Structure 
The structure of the Communist Academy changed several times. In 1931, the Communist Academy included 9 separate institutes, the Natural Science Association, 9 scientific journals and 16 Marxist societies. By the beginning of 1934, the following institutions were part of the system of the Communist Academy:

 Institute of Economics (now - Institute of Economics of the Russian Academy of Sciences);
 Agrarian Institute;
 Institute of Soviet Construction and Law;
 Institute of World Economy and World Politics;
 Institute of Philosophy;
 Institute of History;
 Institute of Literature and Art.
And also the Society of Historians-Marxists, the Society of Agrarian-Marxists, the Society of Marxist-statists and others operated. The General Academic Library operated under the Presidium.

Chairmen and notable employees of the Communist Academy

Chairmen of the Presidium of the Communist Academy 
Mikhail Nikolayevich Pokrovsky (1924–1932)
Maximilian Alexandrovich Saveliev (1932–1936)

Notable employees 
Vladimir Milyutin – from 1925 to 1927, vice-president of the Presidium of the Communist Academy
Otto Schmidt – Head of the Section of Natural and Exact Sciences
Abram Deborin – from 1927 to 1931, Director of the Institute of Philosophy
Vladimir Adoratsky – from 1931 to 1936, Director of the Institute of Philosophy
Evgeny Pashukanis – from 1927, a full member of the Communist Academy, then a member of its Presidium and vice-president, since 1931 director of the Institute of Soviet Construction and Law
Izrail Agol – from 1928, director of the Biological Institute. K. A. Timiryazeva
Kliment Timiryazev – full member
Vladimir Fritsche – director of the Institute of Literature and Art 
Eugen Varga – from 1927, director of the Institute of World Economy and World Politics
Alexander Schlichter – full member
Nikolai Lukin – from 1932, director of the Institute of History 
Ernst Kolman – from 1930, director the Association of Institutes of Natural Science
Vladimir Bonch-Bruevich – full member

See also
 Institute of Red Professors
 Sverdlov Communist University

References

Universities and institutes established in the Soviet Union
1918 establishments in Russia
1936 disestablishments in the Soviet Union
Research institutes in the Soviet Union
Universities and colleges in the Soviet Union
Educational institutions established in 1918
Educational institutions disestablished in 1936